J. Peterman may refer to:

John Peterman, operator of the J. Peterman Company
The J. Peterman Company, an apparel company
Jacopo Peterman, a fictional version of John Peterman, portrayed by John O'Hurley on the television sitcom Seinfeld

See also
Peterman (disambiguation)